Kodungaiyur is a residential neighbourhood in the northern part of the city of Chennai, Tamil Nadu, India. It comes under Perambur Taluk of the Chennai District.

Location and surroundings
Kodungaiyur covers a vast area bordering  Manali to the north, Korukkupet to the east, Madhavaram Milk Colony and Madhavaram to the west, Perambur to the southwest and MKB Nagar (Vysarpadi) to the south.

National Highway 16 (NH 16) touches this area in the southwest at Moolakadai.

Chennai Corporation Limits

Earlier, the ward numbers were 01 (Kodungaiyur West) and 02 (Kodungaiyur East).

In the Expanded Chennai Corporation (200 wards), after delimitation of zones and wards, Kodungaiyur will fall under ward numbers 34, 35, 36 and 37 (all four wards will come under Zone No: IV as per the newly expanded corporation limits).

Main thoroughfares

 Kamarajar salai > Thiruvalluvar street > Manali road (from Moolakadai towards Chinna Kodungaiyur)
 Tondiarpet High (TH) road (from Moolakadai towards KKD Nagar and further till Ezhil Nagar)
 Ethirajsamy Salai (from Erukancherry towards MR Nagar)
Meenambal Salai (from MKB Nagar towards KKD Nagar)

 The southwestern part (older part) of the locality around Kamarajar Salai is called "Periya Kodungaiyur", whereas the northwestern part (relatively recently developed part) around Manali Salai is called "Chinna Kodungaiyur." Thiruvalluvar street making the unofficial divider between these two areas.
 Places like Kamarajar Salai, Tondiarpet High (TH) road, SIDCO Main Road, MR Nagar, Meenambal Salai houses many business entities (supermarkets, restaurants, banks/ATMs, fuel stations, telephone exchange etc.) whereas Kodungaiyur West (Parvathi Nagar, Seetharam Nagar, Narayanaswamy garden, Soundarya Nagar etc.) is a residential neighbourhood.
 P6 Kodungaiyur Police Station is on SIDCO main Road.
 TNEB substation is on SIDCO main Road, KKD Nagar. It is 33/11 KV substation, which delivers power to MR Nagar, KKD Nagar and other eastern parts of Kodungaiyur. Western parts of Kodungaiyur like Narayanasamy garden, RV Nagar, Kamarajar Salai are catered by Sembium substation.
 The Housing Board residences are at KKD Nagar (Phase I) and Muthamil Nagar (Phase II) which are major developments is last 2 decades. Apart from this, private builders contribute to the development of this area, one such is the RC West minister in Kamarajar Salai.

Kaviarasu Kannadasan Nagar (KKD Nagar) is a part of 'Kodungaiyur' in the city of Chennai and both (KKD Nagar & Kodungaiyur) are not separate geographical locations (since it is assumed wrongly that they are different localities as name boards of most commercial establishments display 'KKD Nagar, Chennai-118' and very few shops display 'KKD Nagar, Kodungaiyur, Chennai-118').

Chinna Kodungaiyur and Periya Kodungaiyur alone do not account to the Kodungaiyur's total geographical area as they are merely parts of Kodungaiyur.

Transportation
Metropolitan Transport Corporation (MTC) runs passenger buses to Kodungaiyur from other major parts of Chennai city.
There are 3 bus terminuses in Kodungaiyur. They are Kaviarasu Kannadasan Nagar (KKD Nagar), and Parvathi Nagar.

KKD Nagar

KKD Nagar Terminus is the heart of Kodungaiyur's transportation system.

Parvathi Nagar
Few buses like 38D, 33C, 64K Extn originate and end here.

Educational institutions
Kodungaiyur has a number of educational institutions. Some of them are:

Colleges
 Thiruthangal Nadar College, Selavayal
 Muthu Kumaraswamy Arts and Science College, Muthamil Nagar
 Ambedkar Govt Arts College, MKB Nagar
 Chennai Amirtha, Perambur
 Chevalier T Thomas Elizabeth College for Women, Sembium
 St. Anne's Arts and Science College, Moolakadai
 St Sebastian's Industrial Training Institute

Neighbourhoods
Most notable neighbourhoods in Kodungaiyur are Chinnandimadam, Amudham Nagar, Selavayal, Narayanasamy Garden, Soundarya Nagar, Parvathi nagar, Venkateswara Nagar (Part I & II), Seetharam Nagar, R.V.Nagar, Union Carbide Colony, Brindavan Nagar, Sastri nagar, Jambuli newcolony, Ponnusamy Nagar, Krishna Moorthy Nagar, Vivekananda Nagar, Soundarya Nagar, Ambika Nagar, C hinnandi madam etc.

Apart from these, Muthamil Nagar, MR Nagar, KKD Nagar, Gandhi Nagar and Parvathi Nagar are most important places.

Religion 
There are many churches, mosque and temples.

Theatre
 Pandian A/C formerly Known as Odiyan Mani
 Aiyappa Theatre
 Shanmuga A/c DTS Theatre

Hospital
 Pavithra Hospital
 KVT Multi Speciality Hospital, M.R Nagar
 Subha Hospital, Muthamil Nagar
 Noor Hospital, Chinna Kodungaiyur
 Fathima Hospital, Kodungaiyur, Near Moolakadai
 NRV Hospital, Kodungaiyur
 Arjun Hospital, Kaviarasu Kannadasan Nagar
 ESI dispensary, M.R Nagar.
 Nallam Hospital, M.K.B Nagar
 Sri Durga health centre, Near KKD Nagar E.B

References

Neighbourhoods in Chennai
Suburbs of Chennai
Cities and towns in Chennai district